Tangeh-ye Yek (also Romanized as Tangeh Yek; also known as Bahār Tangeh (Persian: بهارتنگه), Tangeh, Tang Yek, Tingeh, and Tongeh) is a village in Bahmanshir-e Jonubi Rural District, in the Central District of Abadan County, Khuzestan Province, Iran. At the 2006 census, its population was 2,726, in 505 families.

References 

Populated places in Abadan County